İbrahimli is a surname.

İbrahimli may also refer to:

 İbrahimli, Mut, a small village in Mut district of Mersin Province, Turkey
 İbrahimli, Kastamonu, a village in the District of Kastamonu, Kastamonu Province, Turkey